Uttleya williamsi is a species of sea snail, a marine gastropod mollusk, in the family Muricidae, the murex snails or rock snails.

Distribution
This species occurs in New Zealand Exclusive Economic Zone.

References

williamsi
Gastropods described in 1952